The 2022 Comilla City Corporation election was an election in Comilla, Bangladesh, held on 15 June 2022 to elect the 3rd Mayor of Comilla.

Mayoral election result

References 

2022 elections in Bangladesh
2022 in Bangladesh
Comilla City Corporation
Local elections in Bangladesh
June 2022 events in Bangladesh